David Emmer Lee (born March 12, 1973) is an American former Major League Baseball player. A pitcher, Lee played for the Colorado Rockies (-), San Diego Padres, and Cleveland Indians (-). Lee lives in a borough of Pittsburgh called Pleasant Hills.

External links

1973 births
Living people
Albuquerque Isotopes players
American expatriate baseball players in Canada
Asheville Tourists players
Baseball players from Pittsburgh
Buffalo Bisons (minor league) players
Carolina Mudcats players
Cleveland Indians players
Colorado Rockies players
Colorado Springs Sky Sox players
Edmonton Trappers players
Fresno Grizzlies players
Las Vegas 51s players
Major League Baseball pitchers
Memphis Redbirds players
Mercyhurst Lakers baseball players
Mobile BayBears players
Navegantes del Magallanes players
American expatriate baseball players in Venezuela
Norfolk Tides players
Pawtucket Red Sox players
Portland Beavers players
Round Rock Express players
Salem Avalanche players
San Diego Padres players